(John) Owen Jenkins (13 June 1906 – 9 August 1988) was an eminent Welsh Anglican priest in the Twentieth century.

Jenkins was educated at St David's College, Lampeter and Jesus College, Oxford; and ordained in 1930. After curacies in Cwmamman and Carmarthen he held incumbencies at Spittal, Llangadog, Newport  and Llanfihangel Aberbythych. He was Archdeacon of Cardigan from 1962 until 1967; and then of Carmarthen from 1967 until 1974.

References

1906 births
1988 deaths
Alumni of the University of Wales, Lampeter
Alumni of Jesus College, Oxford
Archdeacons of Cardigan
Archdeacons of Carmarthen